Travis Doering  (born July 14, 1991 in Vancouver, British Columbia) is a Canadian systems analyst, writer and film producer.

Career
He is best known for his work as a security consultant and writer, in both the film and news media. In 2018 Doering revealed one of the largest data breaches in Canadian history effecting millions of customers of defunct computer retailer NCIX. In 2015 via the now defunct website Hacker Film Blog, Doering revealed vulnerabilities in Apple's iCloud platform and the breach and subsequent theft of customer data from internet security software company "Bitdefender". In the film industry Doering has served as a technical consultant providing hacking and information technology dialogue on several film and television productions including the Canadian science fiction series "Continuum", the police procedural "Motive" and the American zombie film "Dead Rising: Endgame”. In addition to his work in media, Doering also serves as a systems analyst providing information security consultancy services for high risk individuals and businesses since 2006. Before writing Doering worked in the casting and production department on many Canadian and American film and television productions.

Security Research
In September 2018, Doering posted an editorial title NCIX Data Breach on the blog of his cyber security company Privacy Fly. It outlined a severe data breach at a bankrupt Canadian retailer NCIX in which millions of business records detailing 15 years worth of transactions were sold in a series of backroom deals. The editorial prompted an investigation into the sale by the RCMP and Office of the Information and Privacy Commissioner of British Columbia, as well as a civil lawsuit. In July 2015, Doering created the Hacker Film Blog where he co-authored an article about a security breach at antivirus maker BitDefender. The story was later picked up by Forbes, The Washington Times, and PC World. Two months later in September 2015, Doering posted a documentary titled "Vulnerability: The Secrets Behind iCloud Hacking”. The documentary exposed vulnerabilities being exploited by an underground hacking collective known as RipSec, whose members breached over eleven thousand iCloud accounts, a significant portion of which belonged to Hollywood celebrities like Amanda Seyfried, Kate Mara, and Jamie Foxx.

Edward Snowden Movie
In September 2013, Doering and Film Director Jason Bourque set out to crowdfund a feature film titled "Classified: The Edward Snowden Story".  "Classified" was a biographical feature film based on the life of NSA leaker Edward Snowden, in January 2014 production was shut down and the project was cancelled after losing several key donators due to not reaching their total 1.7 million dollar funding goal. When the production was shutdown Bourque and Doering announced that "Classified" would be split into two separate projects one titled "Vulnerability", a documentary that focuses on IT security and the internet. The second, a feature film based on Snowden's life that would be produced in cooperation with likeminded production companies and film distributors in the near future. In January 2014 existing backers from "Classified" had the option to transfer their donations to "Vulnerability" or have the funds fully refunded. "Vulnerability" was released on September 25, 2015.

Filmography

Feature credits

Television credits

References

External links

Doering's Website
Twitter

1991 births
Film producers from British Columbia
Canadian television producers
Living people
People from Vancouver